Li'l Abner is an album by Shelly Manne and His Friends, recorded in 1957 for Contemporary Records.

Recording and music
The album was recorded at Contemporary's studio, Los Angeles, on February 6, 7, and 25, 1957. The musicians are drummer Shelly Manne, pianist André Previn, and bassist Leroy Vinnegar. The compositions were from the musical Li'l Abner.

Release and reception

Li'l Abner was released by Contemporary Records. The AllMusic review by Scott Yanow states: "The musicians are in fine form but the melodies are not too memorable". The All About Jazz reviewer also found the material limited. It was reissued in the Original Jazz Classics series.

Track listing
All selections composed by Gene de Paul.
 "Jubilation T. Cornpone" - 3:13
 "The Country's in the Very Best of Hands" - 4:39
 "If I Had My Druthers" - 2:46
 "Unnecessary Town" - 5:04
 "Matrimonial Stomp" - 4:35
 "Progress Is the Root of All Evil" - 3:34
 "Oh, Happy Day" - 4:28
 "Namely You" - 5:49
 "Past My Prime" - 7:25

Personnel
André Previn - piano
Shelly Manne - drums
Leroy Vinnegar - bass

References

1957 albums
André Previn albums
Contemporary Records albums
Shelly Manne albums
Original Jazz Classics albums
Leroy Vinnegar albums
Li'l Abner